Who Rules the World, is a 2022 Chinese 
streaming television series starring Yang Yang and Zhao Lusi. It is based on the wuxia romance novel Let's Try The World by Qing Lengyue. It depicts the adventurous love story of Hei Fengxi and Bai Fengxi. The series started airing on Tencent Video and WeTV on April 18, 2022, and concluded its run of 40 episodes on May 17, 2022. It is also currently available worldwide on the online streaming platform Netflix.

Synopsis
Hei Feng Xi is chivalrous and elegant while Bai Feng Xi is majestic and unrestrained. Opposites attract as both are unrivaled in talent and intellect. Caught in the warfare and chaos of the martial arts and political worlds, the flowers of love begin to bloom amidst the blood that has been sacrificed within the last decade. Trying to keep their identities hidden, they constantly have to be three steps ahead when dealing with much political unrest, betrayal, infighting, and the ultimate battle for the imperial throne.

Cast and characters

Main
 Yang Yang as Hei Fengxi / Feng Lanxi
Liu Yiran as Feng Lanxi (young)
 Head of Fountain Abode and second prince of Yongzhou
 Zhao Lusi as Bai Fengxi / Feng Xiyun
Zhang Xiwei as Bai Fengxi (young)
 Disciple of Tian Shuang Sect and princess of Qingzhou

Supporting

Yongzhou
Fountain Abode / Lanxi residence
Huang Yi as Zhong Li, Hei Fengxi's retainer
Wang Xuan as Ren Chuanyu, Hei Fengxi's retainer
Zhao Zhuoting as Ren Chuanyun, Hei Fengxi's guard
Zhao Xin as Huan Niang, Lanxi residence's head maid
Royal Family
Zhang Fengyi as Lord of Yongzhou
Liu Mengling as Lord of Yongzhou (young)
Carman Lee as Queen Baili, Feng Chang and Feng Ju's birth mother
Qi Ge as Concubine Baili (young)
Liu Ruilin as Feng Ju, third prince of Yongzhou. He is an ambitious man who wants to be the next ruler of Yongzhou. He is a sinister man who will do what it takes to achieve his goal including harming his brothers. Wang Yuan is his retainer before being replaced by Li Jia Xian.
Zhang Tianyang as Feng Chang, eldest prince of Yongzhou. Due to having been adopted and raised by the late Queen of Yongzhou, regards Feng Lanxi as a true brother. He has a closer relationship with Feng Lanxi than with Feng Ju. Despite being biological brothers, current Queen Baili has never acknowledged her eldest son due to him being the weakest candidate for the heir position.
Chen Ziqi as Feng Chang (young)
Meng Qin as Princess Yige, late Lady of Yongzhou, Emperor Chun Xi's sister and Feng Lanxi's birth mother
Others
Jiang Baixuan as Ren Rusong, Chancellor of Yongzhou and Hei Fengxi's teacher
Xuan Lu as Feng Qiwu, chief of Feng family and the Minister of Civil Service Affairs. Has a crush on Feng Lanxi.
Jiang Feng as Yuan Lu, head eunuch
Liu Xu as Zhang Zhongge Minister of Justice
Fan Yining as Wang Yuan, Feng Ju's retainer. Was beheaded due to plotting and causing Feng Lanxi's boating accident. Was planted by Feng Ju's side by Step-Lady Baili.
Zhou Yao as Li Jiaxian Retainer sent to Step-Lady Baili's side by Feng Ju as a double agent.

Qingzhou
Tian Shuang Sect
Jiang Kai as Bai Jiande, head of Tian Shuang sect and Bai Fengxi's teacher
Ai Mi as Bai Langhua, Bai Jiande's daughter and disciple of Tian Shuang sect. Love interest of Xiu Jiurong.
Wang Hongyi as Xiu Jiurong, disciple of Tian Shuang sect, rescued as a boy by Bai Fengxi. Love interest of Bai Langhua.
Lu Zhan Xiang as Han Pu, young master of the Han family and adopted brother of Bai Fengxi
Fu Bo Han as Han Pu (young)
Zhang Ruicheng as Gu Yu, 2nd disciple of Tian Shuang sect. Resents Bai Fengxi as Acting Leader and breaks several Sect rules. Died via poison while in prison after being manipulated to kill a high official.
Royal Family
Ma Yue as Lord of Qingzhou and father of Bai Fengxi
Li Jiulin as Feng Xieyue, prince of Qingzhou and brother of Bai Fengxi

Jizhou
Leon Lai Yi as Huang Chao, prince of Jizhou
Zhang Haowei as Yu Wuyuan, Huang Chao's advisor
Leng Jiyuan as Xiao Xuekong, general Sao Xue
He Kailang as Yan Yingzhou, general Lie Feng and head of the four generals of Ji Continent
Cui Tianyi as Huang Yu, princess of Jizhou
Yang Qing Zhu as Qiu Jiu Shuang, Huang Chao's subordinate
Others
Henry Zhao as Ma Meng Qi Chief of Expert Military Horse Training Family

Da Dong
Du Zhiguo as Emperor Chun Xi, emperor of Da Dong
Yi Daqian as Jing Yan, crown prince of Da Dong
Lu Yong as Dong Shufang, general of Da Dong
Feng Ming Jing as Eunuch Hu, Eunuch in the Imperial Apothecary and is the Supreme Physician in the Imperial City black market

Youzhou
An Yuexi as Hua Chunran, princess of Youzhou
Xing Yunjia as Hua Chunran (young)
Wang Gang as Lord of Youzhou
Du Zhao as Hua Chunyuan, prince of Youzhou

Shangzhou
He Yong Sheng as Lord of Shangzhou
Wei Jin Song as Liu Changxiu, Eunuch

Production
The filming of "Who Rules The World" started in Hengdian World Studios and the opening ceremony was held on February 3, 2021. Zhao Lusi participated in the opening ceremony meanwhile Yang Yang was absent due to other schedules. On February 23, 2021, Yang Yang joined the group to start filming. On April 8, 2021, the official Weibo of "Who Rules The World" announced the lineup and released the final posters of the main protagonists. The shooting of whole drama was completed on June 17, 2021.

Reception
The series surpassed 1 billion views on Tencent Video in eleven days after its release.

Soundtrack 
Who Rules the World OST (且试天下 电视原声大碟) consisted of 5 tracks sung by various artists and 20 background scores composed by Dong Dongdong

International broadcast

Who Rules The World was one of the selected dramas broadcast in Hong Kong on September 1, 2022 via TV channel RHTK 31, in commemoration of Hong Kong Special Administrative Region's 25th Anniversary (National Liberation Day). 

On July 24, 2022, Who Rules the World ranked 4th in Netflix Korea’s Top 10 Most Viewed Series, the only foreign show to have made it on the list. 

As at end of 2022, Who Rules the World ranked first in Netflix's Chinese dramas (including Mainland China, Hong Kong and Taiwan) with a score of 3168. It is included in the Netflix Top 10 Series in 16 countries. It is also the only chinese drama to have ever entered the Netflix Top 100 Global so far.

Awards and nominations

References

External links

2020s Chinese television series debuts
2022 Chinese television series debuts
2022 Chinese television series endings
Chinese fantasy television series
Television shows based on Chinese novels
Chinese novels adapted into television series
Television series by Tencent Penguin Pictures
Tencent original programming
Chinese romantic fantasy television series
Chinese wuxia television series